Manilow Sings Sinatra is an album by singer-songwriter Barry Manilow, released in 1998. It is a compilation of Manilow singing songs originally made notable by Frank Sinatra, who had recently died. The album also featured two new compositions, intended as tributes to Sinatra.

Track listing 
"One Man in a Spotlight" (Barry Manilow, Bruce Sussman) (arr. by Manilow) - 0:57
"I've Got the World on a String" (Harold Arlen, Ted Koehler) (originally arr. by Nelson Riddle; arr. by Manilow) - 2:13
"The Second Time Around" (Sammy Cahn, Jimmy Van Heusen) (originally arr. by Riddle; arr. by Manilow) - 3:34
"Come Dance with Me" / "Come Fly with Me" (Cahn, Van Heusen/Cahn, Van Heusen) (originally arr. by Billy May; arr. by Manilow) - 2:59
"All the Way" (Cahn, Van Heusen) (originally arr. by Riddle; arr. by Manilow) - 3:43
"You Make Me Feel So Young" (Josef Myrow, Mack Gordon) (originally arr. by Riddle; arr. by Manilow) - 2:59
"Strangers in the Night" (Bert Kaempfert, Charles Singleton, Eddie Snyder) (originally arr. by Ernie Freeman; arr. by Manilow) - 3:08
"In the Wee Small Hours of the Morning" (Bob Hilliard, David Mann) (originally arr. by Riddle; arr. by Manilow) - 3:34
"Summer Wind" (Heinz Meyer, Hans Bradtke, Johnny Mercer) (originally arr. by Riddle; arr. by Manilow) - 2:46
"Here's to the Man" (Manilow, Sussman) (arr. by Manilow) - 2:01

References

Barry Manilow albums
1998 albums
Frank Sinatra tribute albums
Arista Records albums
Traditional pop albums
Albums recorded at Capitol Studios